Ali Abdul Zahra, (born 1 July 1953 in Basra) is a coach and former international Iraqi football player, who played with  Iraq national football team in  1977 Pestabola Merdeka and scored a goal against  Indonesia, he also played for Al-Minaa club.

International goals
Scores and results list Iraq's goal tally first.

Honors

Local
Al-Mina'a
 1978 Iraqi League: Champion

International
Iraq
 1977 Pestabola Merdeka: runner-up

References

External links
  Iraqi national team players database
Al-Minaa Club: Sailors of south

1953 births
Living people
Iraqi footballers
Al-Mina'a SC players
Sportspeople from Basra
Iraq international footballers
Association football forwards
Iraqi football managers